Tannery of the Year is an awards programme for the global tanning industry, launched in 2009 to celebrate the production of leather and to help promote the material’s use throughout the world in footwear, furniture, car and aeroplane interiors, handbags and other accessories, gloves, and other applications.

Background 

The awards represents a response to the call from the International Leather Forum, an industry gathering that took place in Paris in September 2007, for companies in every part of the industry to speak up for leather, to celebrate its beauty and usefulness, its history and its future.

With the focus on corporate social responsibility, the Tannery of the Year programme will identify the two best tanneries in China, the rest of Asia, the Americas, Africa, and Europe.

Finalists for 2009 

The finalists are as follows:

Europe — Bridge of Weir Leather Company Limited, Renfrewshire, Scotland, and Josef Heinen GmbH & Co KG, Wegberg, Germany.

Africa — Pittards Ethiopia Tannery Share Company, Nazaret, Ethiopia, and South Cape Ostrich Tanning Limited, Mossel Bay, South Africa.

China — ISA TanTec, Guangzhou, and Simona Tanning, Huizhou, both in Guangdong Province.

Americas — Curtiembres Fonseca, Lanús, Buenos Aires, Argentina, and Procesos Húmedos de León, León, Guanajuato, Mexico.

Asia excluding China —  PrimeAsia Vietnam in Bà Rịa, Vũng Tàu, Vietnam, and the Tata International tannery in Dewas, Madhya Pradesh,  India.

An inaugural awards dinner will take place in Hong Kong on March 29, 2010, at which the winner for each region and one global winner will be announced.

The idea behind the Tannery of the Year programme came from World Trades Publishing, a business-to-business publishing company based in Liverpool, United Kingdom, which publishes a leather industry trade magazine called World Leather.

Result for Tannery of the Year 2009 

On March 29, 2010 in Hong Kong, the Ethiopia Tannery Share Company emerged as the winner of the regional competition for Africa, and later as the overall global Tannery of the Year.

The tannery, close to the village of Ejersa, is now owned by the Pittards tanning group. It took over ownership of the company in December 2009, having run it as a partner of previous owners, the Ethiopian government, since 2005.

The five regional award winners were:
Africa—Ethiopia Tannery Share Company
Americas—Curtiembres Fonseca, Argentina
Asia excluding China—PrimeAsia Vietnam
China—Simona Tanning
Europe—Bridge of Weir Leather Company, Scotland.

Tannery of the Year 2011 

A second round of the Tannery of the Year competition ran from the start of November 2010 until the Gala Final event in Shanghai on September 6, 2011. Organisers World Leather have worked out that the Awards programme will work best on 18-month cycles. The third programme will start in early 2012 and come to a conclusion in Hong Kong in March 2013.

Tannery of the Year 2011 Finalists 

Ten finalist tanneries gathered in Shanghai on Tuesday, September 6, 2011 to make presentations to a panel of four judges and answer questions.

The finalists for Tannery of the Year 2011 are as follows.

 Africa - Elico, Addis Ababa, Ethiopia; and Nakara, Windhoek, Namibia.
 Americas - Artículos de Piel Los Favoritos (B’Leather), Santiago, the Dominican Republic; and Coming Indústria e Comércio de Couros, Trindade, Goiás, Brazil.
 Asia excluding China - PT Budi Makmur Jayamurni, Yogyakarta, Indonesia; and TehChang Leather Products Co Ltd, Ta Yuan, Taiwan.
 China - Gansu Hongliang Leather Limited, Gansu Province; and Xing Ye Leather Technology Company, Fujian Province.
 Europe - Heller-Leder, Hehlen, Germany; and Hulshof Royal Dutch Tanneries, Lichtenvoorde, the Netherlands.

Tannery of the Year 2011 Winners 
At the final in Shanghai on September 6, 2011, the following tanneries won the regional awards.

 Africa - Nakara, Namibia.
 Americas - Coming Indústria e Comércio de Couros, Brazil.
 Asia excluding China - TehChang Leather Products Co Ltd, Taiwan.
 China - Xing Ye Leather Technology Company, Fujian Province.
 Europe - Heller-Leder, Germany.

From these five regional winners, Heller-Leder from Germany was named as the global Tannery of the Year for 2011.

Tannery of the Year 2013 

The third programme of Tannery of the Year began in May 2012, with candidates and finalists already named for two of the five regions, Europe and the Americas.

The list of nine shortlisted tanneries from Europe, from which two finalists for the third programme have come were (in alphabetical order):

 António Nunes de Carvalho, Alcanena, Portugal
 Bader, Göppingen, Germany
 Conceria Montebello, Montebello, Italy
 Gruppo Dani, Arzignano, Italy
 Industrias del Curtido SA (Incusa), Silla, Valencia, Spain
 Marmara Deri, Corlu, Turkey
 Sepici Grubu, Caybasi-Izmir, Turkey
 W.J & W Lang, Paisley, Scotland
 Wollsdorf Leder, Wollsdorf, Austria.

From these, Gruppo Dani and Sepici Grubu emerged as finalists, with detailed reports on each published in the June–July issue of World Leather.

After Europe, the programme moved to the Americas. The list of candidates there contained the names of eleven excellent leather producers in a range of countries throughout the Americas, from which two finalists emerged to compete in the final.

The shortlisted tanneries were, in alphabetical order:

 Arlei, Las Toscas, Santa Fe, Argentina
 Curtume Fridolino Ritter, Picada Café, Rio Grande do Sul, Brazil
 Curtume Viposa, Caçador, Santa Catarina, Brazil
 Fuga Couros, Jales, São Paulo, Brazil
 JBS Couros, Cascavel, Ceará, Brazil
 Lefarc, León, Mexico
 Sadesa, San Luis, Argentina
 SB Foot, Red Wing, Minnesota, US
 Suelas Wyny, León, Mexico
 Tenería Panamericana, León, Mexico
 Tyson Group, Dakota City, Nebraska, US.

From this list the two finalist tanneries for the Americas this time were:

- Lefarc, León, Mexico, and
- SB Foot, Red Wing, Minnesota, US.

In-depth reports on the work of both tanneries appeared in the August–September 2012 issue of World Leather and both went forward to take part in the final.

After the Americas, the attention of Tannery of the Year turned to China, followed by Africa and then the fifth of the regions, Asia excluding China, at the start of 2013. Finalists for China were PrimeAsia Leather Corporation, Huangjiang, Guangdong province, and Xuzhou Nanhai Leather Factory Company Limited, Suining County, Jiangsu province. Owing to an unsettled situation in important tanning regions, particularly in North Africa, in 2012 and 2013, there was only one finalist for Africa in the third programme, Seton AutoLeather, South Africa. For Asia excluding China, the finalists were Midori Hokuyo, Japan, and Royal Leather Industries, Pakistan.

Tannery of the Year 2013 Winners 

The final of the third programme took place in Hong Kong on March 25, 2013. The following tanneries emerged as regional winners.

 Africa - Seton AutoLeather, South Africa.
 Americas - SB Foot, Red Wing, Minnesota, US.
 Asia excluding China - Midori Hokuyo, Japan.
 China - PrimeAsia China.
 Europe - Sepici Grubu, Turkey.

From these five regional winners, PrimeAsia China was named as the global Tannery of the Year for 2013.

Tannery of the Year 2014 

The fourth programme of Tannery of the Year began at the end of calendar year 2013, with Europe the first region to come under scrutiny. From eleven shortlisted European tanneries, two emerged as finalists: Couro Azul, Alcanena, Portugal and Wollsdorf Leather, Wollsdorf, Austria. Detailed reports on both these tanneries featured in the December 2013–January 2014 edition of World Leather magazine.

When the programme moved to Asia, excluding China, in the early part of 2014, Packer Leather, from Narangba, Queensland, Australia, and Saigon Tan Tec, Binh Duong Province, Vietnam, emerged as the two finalists for this region. Reports on both tanneries appeared in World Leather, February–March, 2014.

Finalists for the third region, the Americas, were announced on April 24, 2014, with the two tanneries to feature being Bojos Tanning, Santiago, Dominican Republic, and JBS Couros, Itumbiara, Goiás, Brazil. Reports on these two finalists will appear in the April–May, 2014 issue of World Leather.

For China, the finalists for the fourth Tannery of the Year programme were announced on July 3, 2014 as Henan Prosper, Mengzhou City, Henan Province, and Zhejiang Mingxin Automotive Leather, Jiaxing, Zhejiang Province.

There was only one finalist for Africa: Dire Tannery, Addis Ababa, Ethiopia.

The final for the fourth programme took place in Shanghai on September 3, 2014. Regional winners were: Africa - Dire Tannery, Ethiopia; Americas - Bojos Tanning, the Dominican Republic; Asia excluding China - Saigon Tan Tec, Vietnam; China - Mingxin Leather, Zhejiang Province; and Europe - Wollsdorf Leather, Austria.

Following this, the judges announced Wollsdorf Leather from Austria as the fourth winner of the Global Tannery of the Year award. 

World Leather magazine runs Tannery of the Year with backing from the APLF exhibition, chemical manufacturers BASF, Buckman and Lanxess, the International Council of Tanners, the International Union of Leather Technologists and Chemists Societies and the United Nations Industrial Development Organisation.

References 

Leathermaking
Leather manufacturers